David Vienneau (1951–2004) was a Canadian journalist. He was born in Hamilton, Ontario and grew up in nearby Dundas. He graduated from the University of Western Ontario school of journalism in 1975 with an honours degree. He began working for the Toronto Star newspaper that same year, becoming its Ottawa bureau chief in 1995. He was known for his coverage of controversial topics such as Nazi war criminals living in Canada and gun control. Vienneau moved to television in April 1998 as Ottawa bureau chief at for Global News, where he remained until his death from pancreatic cancer on December 1, 2004.

References

1951 births
2004 deaths
Canadian male journalists
Canadian television reporters and correspondents
Deaths from pancreatic cancer
Journalists from Ontario
People from Hamilton, Ontario
Vinneau, David
Deaths from cancer in Ontario